Sewak ot Sevak is an Indian surname meaning "servant" (from Sanskrit seva). Notable people with the surname include:

Deenanath Sewak, Indian politician
Jigneshkumar Sevak, Indian politician
Ram Sewak (disambiguation), multiple people

See also
Mike Sewak (born 1958), American football player and coach
Sevak (name)
Sivak (surname)
Sevak (disambiguation)

Indian surnames